Hydrophilus acuminatus, common name dark diving beetle, is a species of water scavenger beetles belonging to the family Hydrophilidae.

Description
The basic color of the body is dark brown or black. These beetles have streamlined bodies and heads adapted for aquatic life, but they are not powerful swimmers. When they dive they carry a bubble of air under their elytra, while the body is covered by fine hairs trapping a layer of air. Adults are mainly vegetarian, feeding on aquatic plants, but larvae are carnivorous, feeding on tadpoles, snails and small fishes.

Distribution
This species can be found in Russian Far East, China, Japan and Korea.

References
 Zipcodezoo
 Universal Biological Indexer

External links

 Atlas of beetles of Russia
 Silver water beetle by R. Hooper on Japan Times

Hydrophilinae
Beetles described in 1853